Crooked Creek is a stream in the U.S. state of Iowa. It is a tributary to the Skunk River. It splits into an East Fork and West Fork in Washington County.

References

Rivers of Des Moines County, Iowa
Rivers of Henry County, Iowa
Rivers of Iowa
Rivers of Jefferson County, Iowa
Rivers of Washington County, Iowa